Sergio Galeotti (July 26, 1945 – August 14, 1985) was an Italian architect and co-founder of the Giorgio Armani Corporation. Galeotti attended the artistic high school in Carrara and worked at several architectural firms in Italy. Giorgio Armani and Galeotti met in Forte dei Marmi. Tuscany, in 1966. Galeotti was an imminent force behind the Armani machine, he led the financial sector and administrative aspects of the company. He is also credited with empowering Armani to begin his own fashion label.

Career 
In order to build capital to begin the Armani label, Galeotti convinced Armani to sell his Volkswagen Beetle in order to hire a staff and secure office space in Milan.

Personal life 
Galeotti and Armani were in a relationship in the 1970s. Armani recalls that Galeotti's passing made him reevaluate his company and life.

References 

1945 births
1985 deaths
20th-century Italian architects
Armani
Italian LGBT people